Fundulopanchax sjostedti, the blue gularis, golden pheasant gularis or red aphyosemion, is a species of toothcarp endemic to the Niger delta. It is only found in Nigeria and Cameroon. It is named after the Swedish naturalist Bror Yngve Sjöstedt (1866–1948) who collected the type specimen close to a waterfall by the Ndian River, in the Ndian department in Cameroon's Southwest Region.

Description
This species expresses sexual dimorphism. The males are more colourful and larger than the females, expressing very attractive colours. It's a powerful and predatory species, feeding on invertebrates as well as small fish.

References

sjostedti
Fish described in 1895